is a Japanese politician and lawyer who served in the House of Representatives from 2000 to 2012, and as Minister of Justice from 2011 to 2012. He was a member of the Democratic Party of Japan.  As a Representative, he represented the 2nd District of Yamaguchi prefecture.

Early life 
A native of Iwakuni, Yamaguchi, Hiraoka passed the bar exam and civil service exam prior to his graduation at the University of Tokyo. In 1976 he entered the Ministry of Finance which he joined before resigning in 1998 after working in the National Tax Agency's corporate tax department.

Political career 
In 2000, after leaving the ministry, he was elected to a seat of the House of Representatives for the first time; the district he represented, Yamaguchi Prefecture's No. 2 district, was previously a stronghold for the rival Liberal Democratic Party. Following a large-scale upturn by the Liberal Democratic Party, Hiraoka lost his seat by 588 votes, remaining in the Lower House through a process known as proportional representation. In 2008 he took back the Yamaguchi No. 2 seat, marking his fifth term as its representative for the Lower House. Hiraoka was later appointed state secretary for internal affairs and communications in 2010. In September 2011 he was appointed Minister of Justice in the cabinet of newly appointed prime minister Yoshihiko Noda.

He was defeated by Nobuo Kishi (a brother of Prime Minister Shinzo Abe and grandson of Prime Minister Nobusuke Kishi) in the 2012 Japanese general election, and lost his Diet seat. He unsuccessfully stood as a candidate in the 2013 Japanese House of Councillors election and 2014 Japanese general election.

In 2015, he retired from politics and moved to Tokyo to take up law practice. He currently works at a general practice firm in Ginza.

References

External links
 Official website in Japanese.

1954 births
Democratic Party of Japan politicians
Government ministers of Japan
20th-century Japanese lawyers
Members of the House of Representatives (Japan)
Living people
People from Yamaguchi Prefecture
University of Tokyo alumni
21st-century Japanese politicians
21st-century Japanese lawyers